Artem Igorevich Borodulin (born 9 March 1989) is a Russian former competitive figure skater. He is the 2008 World Junior silver medalist and competed at the 2010 Winter Olympics, finishing 13th.

Personal life 
Artem Borodulin was born on 9 March 1989 in Perm, Russian SFSR, Soviet Union. His younger brother, Sergei, has also competed in figure skating. The brothers moved to Moscow in spring 2006.

Career 
Artem Borodulin began skating at age 5. He made his ISU Junior Grand Prix (JGP) debut in 2005. In spring 2006, he relocated from Perm to Moscow. He won two silver medals in the 2006 JGP series. He finished 7th at the 2007 World Junior Championships in Oberstdorf after placing 8th in the short program and 7th in the free skate.

Borodulin won bronze in Vienna and gold in Sofia during the 2007 JGP season. He broke his right ankle while practicing in November 2007 and returned to the ice in early January 2008. At the 2008 World Junior Championships in Sofia, he ranked second in both segments and was awarded the silver medal behind Adam Rippon.

Borodulin's first senior ISU Championship was the 2009 Europeans in Helsinki, Finland. He finished 13th after placing 15th in the short program and 12th in the free skate.

He represented Russia at the 2010 Winter Olympics in Vancouver. Ranked 13th in the short and 12th in the free, he finished 13th overall. He was also sent to the 2010 World Championships in Turin but his skate blade broke as he competed in the short program, forcing his withdrawal. The likelihood of such an event is 1 in 10,000.

Programs

Competitive highlights 
GP: Grand Prix; JGP: Junior Grand Prix

References

External links 

 

1989 births
Russian male single skaters
Figure skaters at the 2010 Winter Olympics
Living people
Olympic figure skaters of Russia
Sportspeople from Perm, Russia
World Junior Figure Skating Championships medalists
Universiade medalists in figure skating
Universiade silver medalists for Russia
Competitors at the 2009 Winter Universiade